Mary Ann Bibby (c.1832 – 13 January 1910) was a New Zealand storekeeper. She was born in Heaton, Lancashire, England. She managed a successful import firm from 1862 onward and became known as one of the first successful businesswomen of the colony.

References

1832 births
1910 deaths
English emigrants to New Zealand
New Zealand traders
19th-century New Zealand businesspeople
19th-century New Zealand businesswomen